Adam Leventhal (born 1979 in the United States) is an American software engineer, and one of the three authors of DTrace, a dynamic tracing facility in Solaris 10 (Sun Microsystems' latest OS) which allows users to observe, debug and tune system behavior in real time. Available to the public since November 2003, DTrace has since been used to find opportunities for performance improvements in production environments. Adam joined the Solaris kernel development team after graduating cum laude from Brown University in 2001 with his B.Sc. in Math and Computer Science. In 2006, Adam and his DTrace colleagues were chosen Gold winners in The Wall Street Journal's Technology Innovation Awards contest by a panel of judges representing industry as well as research and academic institutions. A year after Sun Microsystems was acquired by Oracle Corp, Leventhal announced he was leaving the company. He served as Chief Technology Officer at Delphix from 2010 to 2016.

References

Articles

External links 
Adam Leventhal's blog on dtrace.org
Adam Leventhal's blog from Sun, now hosted by Oracle
Open Solaris Community
The Scoble Show interviews DTrace's creators
Interview with Adam Leventhal in the San Francisco Chronicle
A ZFS developer’s analysis of the good and bad in Apple’s new APFS file system

American computer programmers
American computer scientists
Open source people
Free software programmers
Living people
Solaris people
Brown University alumni
1979 births